Theresa-Marie Rhyne is an expert in the field of computer-generated visualization and a consultant who specializes in applying artistic color theories to visualization and digital media. She has consulted with the Stanford University Visualization Group on a color suggestion prototype system (2013), the Center for Visualization at the University of California at Davis (2013), the Scientific Computing and Imaging Institute at the University of Utah (2010 - 2012) & (2014) on applying color theory to ensemble data visualization and the Advanced Research Computing Unit at Virginia Tech (2019).  Her book on  "Applying Color Theory to Digital Media and Visualization" was published by CRC Press on November 17, 2016. In 2017, Theresa-Marie began exploring color harmony Harmony (color) with the Munsell color system and her work on "Visual Analytics with Complementary and Analogous Color Harmony"  was published in the Munsell Color Blog . In 2018, she organized and contributed to the SIGGRAPH 2018 panel on "Color Mavens Advise on Digital Media Creation and Tools", that included representation from X-Rite/Pantone, Adobe, Rochester Institute of Technology and Pixar and was presented in Vancouver, Canada. In 2019, she combined "her Munsell Color Harmony work with Scientific Visualization efforts". As of 2020, she began writing on applying color to data visualizations for "Nightingale", the journal of the Data Visualization Society and UX Collective "UX Collective", an independent user experience (UX), visual, and product design publication under Medium.

In the 1990s, as a government contractor with Lockheed Martin Technical Services, she was the founding visualization leader of the US Environmental Protection Agency's Scientific Visualization Center. In the 2000s, she founded the Center for Visualization and Analytics and the Renaissance Computing Institute's Engagement Facility at North Carolina State University. Rhyne is the editor of the Visualization Viewpoints Department for IEEE Computer Graphics & Applications Magazine and serves on the Advisory Board of IEEE Computer magazine. She received a BS degree, two MS degrees, and the Degree of Engineer in Civil Engineering from Stanford University.  She entered the computer graphics field as a result of her computational and geographic modeling research in geotechnical and earthquake engineering. She is also an internationally recognized digital media artist who began creating digital media with early Apple computers, including the colorization of early Macintosh educational software. She is a senior member of the IEEE Computer Society and of the Association for Computing Machinery (ACM).

She is also the founding director of the Association for Computing Machinery Special Interest Group on Graphics Cartographic Visualization Project (ACM SIGGRAPH Carto Project) that began in 1996. This effort holds a Birds-of-a-Feather session each year at the annual SIGGRAPH conference.

Articles
Rhyne, T-M. and Hattab, Georges " A Snapshot of IEEE VIS 2020," ACM SIGGRAPH Blog, November 18, 2020, Association for Computing Machinery's Special Interest Group on Graphics (ACM SIGGRAPH) [online].
Rhyne, T-M." A Snapshot of IEEE VIS 2019," ACM SIGGRAPH Blog, December 05, 2019, Association for Computing Machinery's Special Interest Group on Graphics (ACM SIGGRAPH) [online].
Rhyne, T-M., and Chen, M." A Snapshot of IEEE VIS 2018," ACM SIGGRAPH Blog, November 22, 2018, Association for Computing Machinery's Special Interest Group on Graphics (ACM SIGGRAPH) [online].
Rhyne, T-M., and Chen, M." A Snapshot of Current Trends in Visualization," Computing Now, vol. 11, no. 2, February 2018, IEEE Computer Society [online].
Rhyne, T-M., and Chen, M." A Snapshot of Current Trends in Visualization," Computing Now, vol. 10, no. 2, February 2017, IEEE Computer Society [online].
Rhyne, T-M., and Chen, M." A Snapshot of Current Trends in Visualization," Computing Now, vol. 9, no. 3, March 2016, IEEE Computer Society [online].
Rhyne, T-M., "Learning to Color with Apple Macintosh and Related Devices" ACM SIGGRAPH Blog, April 2, 2015. [online].
Rhyne, T-M., and Chen, M." A Snapshot of Current Trends in Visualization," Computing Now, vol. 8, no. 3, March 2015, IEEE Computer Society [online].
Rhyne, T-M., and Chen, M." A Snapshot of Current Trends in Visualization," Computing Now, vol. 7, no. 1, Jan. 2014, IEEE Computer Society [online].
Rhyne, T-M., and Chen, M. "Guest Editor Introduction: Cutting-Edge Research in Visualization", IEEE Computer, 46(5): 22-24, 2013.
Rhyne, Theresa-Marie, "Applying Artistic Color Theories to Visualization", published in Expanding the Frontiers of Visual Analytics and Visualization, Co-Editors: J. Dill, R. A. Earnshaw, D.J. Kasik, J.A. Vince, and P.C. Wong, Publisher: Springer, pp. 263 – 283, 2012.
Livnat, Y., Rhyne, T-M., and Samore, M. "Epinome: A Visual-Analytics Workbench for Epidemiology Data", IEEE Computer Graphics and Applications, 32(2): 89-95, 2012.
Thakur, S. and Rhyne, T-M., "Data Vases: 2D and 3D Plots for Visualizing Multiple Time Series", 5th International Symposium on Visual Computing, ISVC Part II, LNCS 5876, pp. 929–938, Springer-Verlag Berlin Heidelberg.
Thakur, S., Tallury, S., Pasquinelli, M.A., and Theresa-Marie R. "Visualization of the Molecular Dynamics of Polymers and Carbon Nanotubes", 5th International Symposium on Visual Computing, ISVC Part II, LNCS 5876, pp. 129–139, Springer-Verlag Berlin Heidelberg.
Rhyne, T-M., "Exploring Visualization Theory", IEEE Computer Graphics and Applications, 31(3): 6-7, 2011.
 Evans, T. M, Chall, S., Zhao, X. & Rhyne, T-M., “Visualization and Analysis of Microstructure in Three-Dimensional Discrete Numerical Models”, Journal of Computing in Civil Engineering, American Society of Civil Engineers, Sept/Oct 2009, Vol. 23, Issue 5 pp. 277–287.
 Bebis, G., Boyle, R., Parvin, B., Koracin, D., Remagnino, P., Porkili, F., Peters, J., Klosowski, J., Arns, L., Chun, Y., Rhyne, T-M., and Manore. L., Advances in Visual Computing: 4th International Symposium, ISVC 2008, Las Vegas, Nevada, December 1–3, 2008, Proceedings, Part I & II.
 Rhyne, T. M., Visualization and the Larger World of Computer Graphics, Transportation Research News (a publication of the Transportation Research Board of the National Research Council, USA), No. 252, Sept/Oct 2007, 20-23.
 Rhyne, T. M., MacEachren, A., and Dykes, J. (2006). Guest Editors' Introduction: Exploring Geovisualization. IEEE Computer Graphics and Applications 26(4), 20-21.
 North, C., Rhyne, T. M., Duca, K., (2005) Bioinformatics Visualization: Introduction to the Special Issue. ''Information Visualization 4(3): 147-148.
Theresa-Marie Rhyne, Melanie Tory, Tamara Munzner, Matthew O. Ward, Chris Johnson, and David H. Laidlaw, "Information and Scientific Visualization: Separate but Equal or Happy Together at Last.", IEEE Visualization 2003 Proceedings, October 2003, pp. 619–621.
 panel presentation at IEEE Visualization 2003 on the similarities and differences between the Visualization subfields of Scientific Visualization and Information Visualization
 Rhyne, T. M. (2003). Does the difference between information and scientific visualization really matter?. IEEE computer graphics and applications, 23(3), 6-8.
 Rhyne, T. M. (2002). Computer games and scientific visualization. Communications of the ACM, 45(7), 40-44.
 discussion on the impact computer games is having on the field of scientific visualization
 Theresa-Marie Rhyne, Alan Turner, Ron Vetter, Lars Bishop, and David Holmes. ACM SIGGRAPH 2002 Course #48 Notes: Dynamic Media on Demand: Exploring Wireless & Wired Streaming Technologies and Content, (distributed at SIGGRAPH 2002, July 2002). http://www.siggraph.org/~rhyne/stream/
 overview of streaming media and case study examples from NCSU
 A. Chalmers & T.-M. Rhyne (Guest Editors). Eurographics 2001 Conference Proceedings, Computer Graphics Forum, Vol. 20, No. 3, Conference Issue, Manchester, United Kingdom, September 3–7, 2001.
 as the Eurographics 2001 programme/papers co-chair, served as guest editor of the publication volume associated with the Eurographics 2001 conference proceedings
 Theresa-Marie Rhyne, Bob Barton, Grantley Day, Don Brutzman, and Mike Macedonia. ACM SIGGRAPH 2001 Course #26 Notes: Internetworked 3D Computer Graphics: Overcoming Bottlenecks, Supporting Collaboration, and Stepping Up to Wireless Connectivity.(distributed at SIGGRAPH 2001, August 2001).
 overview of internet technologies, streaming media, and online 3d computer graphics.

References

External links
 Theresa-Marie Rhyne's Blog on Applying Color Theory to Digital Media and Visualization

Living people
Year of birth missing (living people)
Computer graphics professionals
Visualization (research)